Maud Perry Menzies O.St.J. (1911 – 21 June 1997) was a Scottish physician who specialised in community medicine. She introduced significant improvements to public health care in Glasgow.

Early life and education
Maud Perry MacDougall was born in 1911. She studied medicine at the University of Glasgow from where she received her medical degree in 1934 when she was one of a minority of women graduates. As the highest ranked student in surgery that year, she was awarded the Sir William Macewen Medal.

She was a supporter of the Glasgow Football club Rangers.

Career
After qualifying in medicine, Menzies worked as a general practitioner with her husband. In 1938, she returned to Glasgow to take up a post as assistant Medical Officer for Health. At the time, the child death rate in Glasgow was the highest in Europe. She set up a diphtheria immunisation programme in Rutherglen.

Menzies served in the Royal Army Medical Corps (RAMC) during the Second World War, enlisting in 1942. She was posted to Normandy to work with the 79th British General Hospital soon after the D-Day landings in 1944 and served with the RAMC throughout the European campaign.

After the war, Menzies joined the Glasgow school health service. She was an active member of the Scottish branch of the British Medical Association and took a role on council and later as chairman of the Glasgow division. Menzies established the Faculty of Community Health and was on the faculty in the 1970s. In 1990, she was made an officer of the Most Venerable Order of the Hospital of Saint John of Jerusalem by Queen Elizabeth II.

Death and legacy
Menzies died on 21 June 1997. The medical bag and the syringe that she used to administer immunisations are held by the Royal College of Physicians and Surgeons of Glasgow.

Awards and honours
 Sir William Macewen Medal
 1990, officer of the Most Venerable Order of the Hospital of Saint John of Jerusalem

References

British public health doctors
1911 births
1997 deaths
20th-century Scottish medical doctors
Scottish women medical doctors
Alumni of the University of Glasgow
Officers of the Order of St John
Royal Army Medical Corps officers
British Army personnel of World War II
20th-century women physicians
20th-century Scottish women
Women public health doctors